Turaga na Vunivalu na Tui Kaba is the Paramount Chief of the Kubuna Confederacy, loosely translated the title means Warlord of Bau or Root of War. The succession to the title does not follow primogeniture, but the candidate must be a high-ranking member of the Tui Kaba clan.

History
The Vunivalu was not always the senior Chieftain in Kubuna and Bau. When Vueti a great grandson of Lutunasobasoba defeated the Tui Viti's sons at Nakauvadra, he was awarded with a Tui Viti sacred stone- award signifying authority (tawake or flag). From Nakauvadra, he left via Nakorotubu and had his 1st child, a son through supernatural powers or Gonesau  known as Nadurucoko who was raised by the Dewala tribe at Korolevu fort in Dewala, Nakorotubu. Nadurucoko the first (1st) Gonesau, was the father of Nabuinivuaka Nailatikau 1- the 1st Vunivalu of Bau. He then continued on his returned journey to Moturiki and finally to Bau. Vueti as the founder of Bau island in short for 'veibauyaki' or nomadic tribe (named after his last temporary nomadic residence in Bau in Wainibuka) was bestowed with the Roko Tui Bau title. Vueti then ordered for a sacred temple to be built in Bau and kept the Tui Viti sacred stone award of authority (tawake) that was given by the chiefs at Nakauvadra at the foundation mound and named the temple as Vatanitawake translated as 'the shelter or shelve of the signifying authority award or flag'.

The Vunivalu of Bau title was considered subordinate to the Roko Tui Bau. Power struggles between the various chiefly households came to a head with the exile of the Vunivalu Tanoa Visawaqa in the early 19th century after a series of murders and reprisals. His son Seru Epenisa Cakobau however was allowed to remain in Bau during his fathers exile. Cakobau gained power by subverting the Lasakau people to plot and execute the overthrow of the ruling group, led by Ratu Ravulo Vakayaliyalo, in 1837; Seru Epenisa Cakobau then reinstated his father as ruler.

Cakobau eventually succeeded to the title himself. He created much of its prestige by styling himself King of Fiji; he led the process that culminated in cession of the islands to the United Kingdom in 1874.

The position has been vacant since the death of the last Vunivalu, Ratu Sir George Cakobau, in 1989.

Search for a successor
Over the past decade, there have been moves to choose a successor.  On 9 June 2005, Senator Ratu George Cakobau Jr. (son of the last Vunivalu) announced that the chiefs of Matanitu o Bau (the traditional chiefly government of Bau, which includes the districts of Namata, Namara, Nausori, Dravo, Buretu, Kiuva, and Viwa (Fiji), had selected four chiefly candidates, to be submitted to the Tui Kaba clan, which will be asked to choose one of them as the next Vunivalu. The four candidates are Ratu George Cakobau Jr. himself, his brother Ratu Epenisa Cakobau, Ratu George Kadavulevu Naulivou, and now deceased former Vice-President Ratu Jope Seniloli. A second meeting held a week later tentatively proposed Senator Cakobau as the new Vunivalu.

As of 2015, Cakobau's appointment has still not been finalized and is not without controversy. Adi Finau Tabakaucoro, a member of the Tui Kaba clan and a senior chief, complained on 27 June that the proper procedures were not being followed.  The new Vunivalu should be elected by the whole clan, she said, rather than chosen by a few elders. She thought it wrong to exclude from the list of candidates the name of Senator Cakobau's sister, Adi Samanunu Cakobau-Talakuli, because she was the eldest child of the last Vunivalu.

Attempts to find a successor again failed in 2012, and the selection process was put on hold for the time being. Senator Cakobau died 25 June 2018.

Other titles
The Vunivalu when installed, also takes the title of Tui Levuka, as he is the traditional leader of the Levuka people of Lakeba, Lau.  The wife of the Vunivalu is titled Radi Levuka.

See also 
 Lasakau sea warriors
 Roko Tui Bau

Footnotes

References

Fiji and the Fijians, by Thomas Williams, James Calvert.
 Voyage Round the World: Embracing the Principal Events of the Narrative of the United States... - Page 383, by Charles Wilkes - 1849
 Elites: choice, leadership and succession - Page 116, by João de Pina-Cabral, Antónia Pedroso de Lima - Social Science - 2000
 The Fijians - Page 62, 1908.
 The Golden Bough A Study in Magic and Religion: A New Abridgement from the Second and Third Editions - Page 149, by Sir James George Frazer - 1998.
‘Matanitu’ the struggle for power in early Fiji by David Routledge 1985 – published by the Institute of Pacific studies and the University of the South Pacific Fiji, Chapter 2 Struggle between the Chiefs 1760 to 1842 Page 40,56
 Tukutuku Raraba – History of Bau – Chapter 1 Page 1, records tabulated by the Native Lands and Fisheries Commission, the book The Pacific Way – A Memoir by Ratu Sir Kamisese Mara published by the University of Hawaii press Honolulu refers to the ‘Tukutuku Raraba’ as the ‘registrar of land owners rights and customs’
 Oceania By University of Sydney, Australian National Research Council - 1930.
 Fiji’s Heritage a history of Fiji by Kim Gravelle reprinted under its new name in 2000 it was originally published as Fiji Times a history of Fiji in 1979. , Published by Tiara enterprises Nadi.
The Cambridge History of the Pacific Islanders, Page 189 - 190, By Malama Meleisea, Donald Denoon, Karen .L Nero, Jocylyn Linnekin, Stewart Firth
Apologies to Thucydides: Understanding History as culture and Vice Versa, By Marshal Sahlins.
 Vunivalu of Bau - NLC Family Tree (1923).

External links 
 Vunivalu
 Article on Bau and the Vunivalu with some historical details.

 
.
Fijian nobility
Titles of national or ethnic leadership
Tui Kaba
People from Bau (island)
People from Lomaiviti Province
People from Naitasiri Province
People from Tailevu Province
People from Ra Province